Valentin Strukov (born 21 March 1953 in Irboska, Pskov Oblast) is an Estonian politician. He was a member of VIII Riigikogu.

References

Living people
1953 births
Members of the Riigikogu, 1995–1999
People from Pskov Oblast